Symphorosa (died circa AD 138) is venerated as a saint of the Catholic Church. According to tradition, she was martyred with her seven sons at Tibur (present Tivoli, Lazio, Italy) toward the end of the reign of the Roman Emperor Hadrian (117–38).

Narrative
The story of their martyrdom is told in an ancient Passio, the credibility of which is seriously questioned by many modern hagiologists. According to the Passio, Symphorosa was a Tiburtine matron and the widow of Getulius, a native of Gabii in Sabina. He was a tribune  in the Roman army, but resigned upon being baptized a Christian, ultimately retiring to his estate near Tivoli, where he was joined by his brother, Amantius.
Getulius and Amantius were subsequently beheaded under Emperor Hadrian. Symphorosa buried his  remains on their estate.

Not long after, Symphorosa and her children were arrested. When all of the Emperor's attempts to induce Symphorosa and her sons to sacrifice to the pagan Roman gods were unsuccessful, he ordered her to be brought to the Temple of Hercules, where, after various tortures, she was thrown into the Anio River with a heavy rock fastened to her neck. Her brother Eugenius, who was a member of the council of Tibur, buried her with her husband.

Her seven sons
The next day, the emperor summoned Symphorosa's seven sons, and being equally unsuccessful in his attempts to make them sacrifice to the gods, he ordered them to be tied to seven stakes erected for the purpose round the Temple of Hercules. The emperor ordered all seven to be tortured, and finally pierced with the sword.

Their bodies were thrown en masse into a deep ditch at a place the pagan priests afterwards called Ad septem Biothanatos (the Greek word biodanatos, or rather biaiodanatos, was employed for self-murderers and, by the pagans, applied to Christians who suffered martyrdom). Hereupon the persecution ceased for one year and six months, during which period the bodies of the martyrs were recovered by the Christian community and buried on the Via Tiburtina, eight or nine miles (14 km) from Rome.

Authenticity
It is difficult to ascertain how much reliability these Acts possess. The opinion that they were written by Julius Africanus (3rd century) has been rejected almost universally, since neither Eusebius nor any other contemporary historian makes the least allusion to any Acts of Roman or Italian martyrs composed by this African writer.

The Hieronymian Martyrology, which was compiled by an unknown author in the second half of the 5th century, commemorates St. Symphorosa and her sons on 18 July, but here the names of her sons are entirely different from those given in the Acts. 

Since here the names of Symphorosa's sons are different from those of the Acts we possess, there must have existed some other Gesta to which the author of the martyrology refers. In the same martyrology, on 27 June, are commemorated seven brother-martyrs, whose names are identical with those our Acts assign to the sons of Symphorosa. It is probable that the author of the Acts, guided by the tradition that Symphorosa had seven sons who were martyred, made her the mother of the seven martyrs, whom he found mentioned in the martyrology on 27 June. If this is the case, we may infer, provided Symphorosa had seven sons at all, that their names were not those mentioned in the Acts. Whether they were those assigned to them in the Hieronymian Martyrology will also remain doubtful as long as we have no certainty that the Gesta to which the author refers are authentic. Some hagiologists consider the seven sons of Symphorosa, like those of Felicitas of Rome, a mere adaptation of the seven sons of the Maccabean Mother. Paul Allard dealt with her story uncritically in his work.

In the 17th century, Bosio discovered the ruins of a basilica at the place popularly called "le sette fratte" (taken to be a corruption of words meaning "the seven brothers"), on the Via Tiburtina, nine miles (14 km) from Rome. The Acts and the Hieronymian Martyrology agree in designating this spot as the tomb of Symphorosa and her sons. Further discoveries, that leave no room for doubt that the basilica was built over their tomb, were made by Stevenson. The remains were transferred to the Church of Sant'Angelo in Pescheria at Rome by Pope Stephen II in 752. A sarcophagus was found here in 1610, bearing the inscription: Hic requiescunt corpora SS. Martyrum Simforosae, viri sui Zotici (Getulii) et Filiorum ejus a Stephano Papa translata (Here rest the bodies of the holy martyrs Symphorosa, her husband Zotius (Getulius) and her sons, transferred by Pope Stephen).

Veneration

The Diocese of Tivoli honours them as patron saints and they are mentioned in the Roman Martyrology on 18 July. However, they are no longer included in the General Roman Calendar. The reason given for their removal was that the information given in their Acts, which are thought to be an imitation of the Passio of Saint Felicitas of Rome and her seven sons, is untrustworthy.

In medieval times Settecamini was called "Field of Seven Brothers" in relation to the legend of Saint Symphorosa and her seven children.

There is a St. Symphorosa Elementary School in Chicago, Illinois.

References

External links
 Sinforosa y sus siete hijos, mártires (s. II)

138 deaths
2nd-century Christian martyrs
Ante-Nicene Christian female saints
Groups of Christian martyrs of the Roman era
People executed by drowning
Year of birth unknown